Redwing (YTB-783) was a United States Navy  named for the Redwing songbird.

Construction
The contract for Redwing was awarded 31 January 1964. She was laid down on 9 August 1965 at Marinette, Wisconsin, by Marinette Marine and launched 20 October 1965.

Operational history
 
Placed in service in June 1965, Redwing, was fitted with special fenders to allow her to work with the United States Navy's round-hulled nuclear-powered submarines, operated in the 11th and 12th Naval Districts, assisting larger Navy ships in docking and performing general towing services.

Beginning in 1969, Redwing was assigned to Adak Army Base and Adak Naval Operating Base, Adak, Alaska, operating in rough North Pacific waters. As the only two work boats assigned to the very busy cold war base on Adak, they were kept very busy.

Stricken from the Navy Directory on 28 March 2003, Redwing was transferred to the Local Redevelopment Authority 17 March 2004.

References

External links
 

 

Natick-class large harbor tugs
Ships built by Marinette Marine
1965 ships